Hernandez is an unincorporated community and census-designated place in Rio Arriba County, New Mexico, United States.

Geography

The Hernandez CDP had a population of 946 in the 2010 census,

The entire Hernandez area has the ZIP code 87537, pointing to ZIP Code Tabulation Area 87537 (ZCTA), with a population of 2,957 in the 2010 U.S. census.

Demographics

The racial makeup of the Hernandez ZCTA was 58.4% White, 0.4% African American, 2.6% Native American, 0.4% Asian, 35.3% from other races, and 2.9% from two or more races. Hispanic or Latino of any race were 88.9% of the population.

Education
It is in Española Public Schools. Hernandez has one elementary school, Hernandez Elementary. The comprehensive public high school is Española Valley High School.

In popular culture
Hernandez became well known as the site of Moonrise, Hernandez, New Mexico, a black and white photograph taken by Ansel Adams, late in the afternoon on November 1, 1941, from a shoulder of highway US 84 / US 285.  The fame of Hernandez grew when an escalation in the market value of photographic works was launched in 1971, when a 1948 print of this image of Hernandez sold at auction "for the then-unheard-of price of $71,500" ($ today), with that same copy selling in 2006 for $609,600 ($ today) at a Sotheby's New York auction.

In 1931, Georgia O'Keeffe visited the community and completed her painting Another Church, Hernandez, New Mexico, showing the front and partial interior of an adobe church in the community.

See also
List of most expensive photographs

References

External links
Image of "Moonrise"
Prints of "Moonrise", 1941-1975
Site of "Moonrise", circa 2000
Image of  "Another Church, Hernandez, New Mexico" 

Unincorporated communities in Rio Arriba County, New Mexico
Unincorporated communities in New Mexico
Census-designated places in New Mexico
Census-designated places in Rio Arriba County, New Mexico